Leo Max Frank (April 17, 1884August 17, 1915) was an American factory superintendent who was convicted in 1913 of the murder of a 13-year-old employee, Mary Phagan, in Atlanta, Georgia. His trial, conviction, and appeals attracted national attention. His lynching two years later, in response to the commutation of his death sentence, became the focus of social, regional, political, and racial concerns, particularly regarding antisemitism. Today, the consensus of researchers is that Frank was wrongly convicted and Jim Conley was likely the actual murderer.

Born to a Jewish-American family in Texas, Frank was raised in New York and earned a degree in mechanical engineering from Cornell University before moving to Atlanta in 1908. Marrying in 1910, he involved himself with the city's Jewish community and was elected president of the Atlanta chapter of the B'nai B'rith, a Jewish fraternal organization, in 1912. At that time, there were growing concerns regarding child labor at factories. One of these children was Mary Phagan, who worked at the National Pencil Company where Frank was director. The girl was strangled on April 26, 1913, and found dead in the factory's cellar the next morning. Two notes, made to look as if she had written them, were found beside her body. Based on the mention of a "night witch", they implicated the night watchman, Newt Lee. Over the course of their investigations, the police arrested several men, including Lee, Frank, and Jim Conley, a janitor at the factory.

On May 24, 1913, Frank was indicted on a charge of murder and the case opened at Fulton County Superior Court, July 28, 1913. The prosecution relied heavily on the testimony of Conley, who described himself as an accomplice in the aftermath of the murder, and who the defense at the trial argued was, in fact, the perpetrator of the murder. A guilty verdict was announced on August 25. Frank and his lawyers made a series of unsuccessful appeals; their final appeal to the Supreme Court of the United States failed in April 1915. Considering arguments from both sides as well as evidence not available at trial, Governor John M. Slaton commuted Frank's sentence from capital punishment to life imprisonment.

The case attracted national press attention and many reporters deemed the conviction a travesty. Within Georgia, this outside criticism fueled antisemitism and hatred toward Frank. On August 16, 1915, he was kidnapped from prison by a group of armed men, and lynched at Marietta, Mary Phagan's hometown, the next morning. The new governor vowed to punish the lynchers, who included prominent Marietta citizens, but nobody was charged. In 1986, Frank was posthumously pardoned by the Georgia State Board of Pardons and Paroles, although not officially absolved of the crime. The case has inspired books, movies, a play, a musical, and a TV miniseries.

His case spurred the creation of the Anti-Defamation League and the resurgence of the Ku Klux Klan.

Background

Social and economic conditions

In the early 20th century, Atlanta, Georgia's capital city, underwent significant economic and social change. To serve a growing economy based on manufacturing and commerce, many people left the countryside to relocate in Atlanta. Men from the traditional and paternalistic rural society felt it degrading that women were moving to the city to work in factories.

During this era, Atlanta's rabbis and Jewish community leaders helped to resolve animosity toward Jews. In the half-century from 1895, David Marx was a prominent figure in the city. In order to aid assimilation, Marx's Reform temple adopted Americanized appearances. Friction developed between the city's German Jews, who were integrated, and Russian Jews who had recently immigrated. Marx said the new residents were "barbaric and ignorant" and believed their presence would create new antisemitic attitudes and a situation which made possible Frank's guilty verdict. Despite their success, many Jews recognized themselves as different from the Gentile majority and were uncomfortable with their image. Despite his own acceptance by Gentiles, Marx believed that "in isolated instances there is no prejudice entertained for the individual Jew, but there exists wide-spread and deep seated prejudice against Jews as an entire people."

An example of the type of tension that Marx feared occurred in April 1913: at a conference on child labor, some participants blamed the problem, in part, on the fact that many factories were Jewish-owned. Historian Leonard Dinnerstein summarized Atlanta's situation in 1913 as follows:

Early life
Leo Max Frank was born in Cuero, Texas on April 17, 1884 to Rudolph Frank and Rachel "Rae" Jacobs. The family moved to Brooklyn in 1884 when Leo was three months old. He attended New York City public schools and graduated from Pratt Institute in 1902. He then attended Cornell University, where he studied mechanical engineering. After graduating in 1906, he worked briefly as a draftsman and as a testing engineer.

At the invitation of his uncle Moses Frank, Leo traveled to Atlanta for two weeks in late October 1907 to meet a delegation of investors for a position with the National Pencil Company, a manufacturing plant in which Moses was a major shareholder. Frank accepted the position, and traveled to Germany to study pencil manufacturing at the Eberhard Faber pencil factory. After a nine-month apprenticeship, Frank returned to the United States and began working at the National Pencil Company in August 1908. Frank became superintendent of the factory the following month, earning $180 per month plus a portion of the factory's profits.

Frank was introduced to Lucille Selig shortly after he arrived in Atlanta. She came from a prominent, upper-middle class Jewish family of industrialists who, two generations earlier, had founded the first synagogue in Atlanta. They married in November 1910. Frank described his married life as happy.

In 1912, Frank was elected president of the Atlanta chapter of the B'nai B'rith, a Jewish fraternal organization. The Jewish community in Atlanta was the largest in the Southern United States, and the Franks belonged to a cultured and philanthropic community whose leisure pursuits included opera and bridge. Although the Southern United States was not specifically known for its antisemitism, Frank's northern culture and Jewish faith added to the sense that he was different.

Murder of Mary Phagan

Phagan's early life
Mary Phagan was born on June 1, 1899, into an established Georgia family of tenant farmers. Her father died before she was born. Shortly after Mary's birth, her mother, Frances Phagan, moved the family back to their hometown of Marietta, Georgia. During or after 1907, they again relocated to East Point, Georgia, in southwest Atlanta, where Frances opened a boarding house. Mary Phagan left school at age 10 to work part-time in a textile mill. In 1912, after her mother married John William Coleman, the family moved into the city of Atlanta. That spring, Phagan took a job with the National Pencil Company, where she earned ten cents an hour operating a knurling machine that inserted rubber erasers into the metal tips of pencils, and worked 55 hours per week. She worked across the hallway from Leo Frank's office.

Discovery of Phagan's body

On April 21, 1913, Phagan was laid off due to a materials shortage. Around noon on April 26, she went to the factory to claim her pay. The next day, shortly before 3:00 a.m., the factory's night watchman, Newt Lee, went to the factory basement to use the toilet. After leaving the toilet, Lee discovered Phagan's body in the rear of the basement near an incinerator and called the police.

Her dress was up around her waist and a strip from her petticoat had been torn off and wrapped around her neck. Her face was blackened and scratched, and her head was bruised and battered. Her underwear was still around her hips, but stained with blood and torn open. Her skin was covered with ashes and dirt from the floor, initially making it appear to first responding officers that she and her assailant had struggled in the basement.

A service ramp at the rear of the basement led to a sliding door that opened into an alley; the police found the door had been tampered with so it could be opened without unlocking it. Later examination found bloody fingerprints on the door, as well as a metal pipe that had been used as a crowbar. Some evidence at the crime scene was improperly handled by the police investigators: a trail in the dirt (from the elevator shaft) along which police believed Phagan had been dragged was trampled; the footprints were never identified.

Two notes were found in a pile of rubbish by Phagan's head, and became known as the "murder notes". One said: "he said he wood love me land down play like the night witch did it but that long tall black negro did boy his slef." The other said, "mam that negro hire down here did this i went to make water and he push me down that hole a long tall negro black that hoo it wase long sleam tall negro i write while play with me." The phrase "night witch" was thought to mean "night watch[man]"; when the notes were initially read aloud, Lee, who was black, said: "Boss, it looks like they are trying to lay it on me." Lee was arrested that morning based on these notes and his apparent familiarity with the bodyhe stated that the girl was white, when the police, because of the filth and darkness in the basement, initially thought she was black. A trail leading back to the elevator suggested to police that the body had been moved by Lee.

Police investigation

In addition to Lee, the police arrested a friend of Phagan's for the crime. Gradually, the police became convinced that these were not the culprits. By Monday, the police had theorized that the murder occurred on the second floor (the same as Frank's office) based on hair found on a lathe and what appeared to be blood on the ground of the second floor.

Both Newt Lee, after the discovery of Phagan's body, and the police, just after 4 a.m., had unsuccessfully tried to telephone Frank early on Sunday, April 27. The police contacted him later that morning and he agreed to accompany them to the factory. When the police arrived after 7 a.m. without telling the specifics of what happened at the factory, Frank seemed extremely nervous, trembling, and pale; his voice was hoarse, and he was rubbing his hands and asking questions before the police could answer. Frank said he was not familiar with the name Mary Phagan and would need to check his payroll book. The detectives took Frank to the morgue to see Phagan's body and then to the factory, where Frank viewed the crime scene and walked the police through the entire building. Frank returned home about 10:45 a.m. At this point, Frank was not considered a suspect.

On Monday, April 28, Frank, accompanied by his attorney, Luther Rosser, gave a written deposition to the police that provided a brief timeline of his activities on Saturday. He said Phagan was in his office between 12:05 and 12:10 p.m., that Lee had arrived at 4 p.m. but was asked to return later, and that Frank had a confrontation with ex-employee James Gantt at 6 p.m. as Frank was leaving and Lee arriving. Frank explained that Lee's time card for Sunday morning had several gaps (Lee was supposed to punch in every half-hour) that Frank had missed when he discussed the time card with police on Sunday. At Rosser's insistence, Frank exposed his body to demonstrate that he had no cuts or injuries and the police found no blood on the suit that Frank said he had worn on Saturday. The police found no blood stains on the laundry at Frank's house.

Frank then met with his assistant, N. V. Darley, and Harry Scott of the Pinkerton National Detective Agency, whom Frank hired to investigate the case and prove his innocence. The Pinkerton detectives would investigate many leads, ranging from crime scene evidence to allegations of sexual misconduct on the part of Frank. The Pinkertons were required to submit duplicates of all evidence to the police, including any that hurt Frank's case. Unbeknownst to Frank, however, was Scott's close ties with the police, particularly his best friend, detective John Black who believed in Frank's guilt from the outset.

On Tuesday, April 29, Black went to Lee's residence at 11 a.m. looking for evidence, and found a blood-smeared shirt at the bottom of a burn barrel. The blood was smeared high up on the armpits and the shirt smelled unused, suggesting to the police that it was a plant. The detectives, suspicious of Frank due to his nervous behavior throughout his interviews, believed that Frank had arranged the plant.

Frank was subsequently arrested around 11:30 a.m. at the factory. Steve Oney states that "no single development had persuaded ... [the police] that Leo Frank had murdered Mary Phagan. Instead, to the cumulative weight of Sunday's suspicions and Monday's misgivings had been added several last factors that tipped the scale against the superintendent." These factors were the dropped charges against two suspects; the rejection of rumors that Phagan had been seen on the streets, making Frank the last person to admit seeing Phagan; Frank's meeting with the Pinkertons; and a "shifting view of Newt Lee's role in the affair." The police were convinced Lee was involved as Frank's accomplice and that Frank was trying to implicate him. To bolster their case, the police staged a confrontation between Lee and Frank while both were still in custody; there were conflicting accounts of this meeting, but the police interpreted it as further implicating Frank.

On Wednesday, April 30, a coroner's inquest was held. Frank testified about his activities on Saturday and other witnesses produced corroboration. A young man said that Phagan had complained to him about Frank. Several former employees spoke of Frank flirting with other women; one said she was actually propositioned. The detectives admitted that "they so far had obtained no conclusive evidence or clues in the baffling mystery ...". Lee and Frank were both ordered to be detained.

In May, the detective William J. Burns traveled to Atlanta to offer further assistance in the case. However, his Burns Agency withdrew from the case later that month. C. W. Tobie, a detective from the Chicago affiliate who was assigned to the case, said that the agency "came down here to investigate a murder case, not to engage in petty politic[s]." The agency quickly became disillusioned with the many societal implications of the case, most notably the notion that Frank was able to evade prosecution due to his being a rich Jew, buying off the police and paying for private detectives.

James "Jim" Conley

The prosecution based much of its case on the testimony of Jim Conley, the factory's janitor, who is believed by many historians to be the actual murderer. The police had arrested Conley on May 1 after he had been seen washing red stains out of a blue work shirt; detectives examined it for blood, but determined that it was rust as Conley had claimed, and returned it. Conley was still in police custody two weeks later when he gave his first formal statement. He said that, on the day of the murder, he had been visiting saloons, shooting dice, and drinking. His story was called into question when a witness told detectives that "a black negro ... dressed in dark blue clothing and hat" had been seen in the lobby of the factory on the day of the murder. Further investigation determined that Conley could read and write, and there were similarities in his spelling with that found on the murder notes. On May 24, he admitted he had written the notes, swearing that Frank had called him to his office the day before the murder and told him to write them. After testing Conley again on his spellinghe spelled "night watchman" as "night witch"the police were convinced he had written the notes. They were skeptical about the rest of his story, not only because it implied premeditation by Frank, but also because it suggested that Frank had confessed to Conley and involved him.

In a new affidavit (his second affidavit and third statement), Conley admitted he had lied about his Friday meeting with Frank. He said he had met Frank on the street on Saturday, and was told to follow him to the factory. Frank told him to hide in a wardrobe to avoid being seen by two women who were visiting Frank in his office. He said Frank dictated the murder notes for him to write, gave him cigarettes, then told him to leave the factory. Afterward, Conley said he went out drinking and saw a movie. He said he did not learn of the murder until he went to work on Monday.

The police were satisfied with the new story, and both The Atlanta Journal and The Atlanta Georgian gave the story front-page coverage. Three officials of the pencil company were not convinced and said so to the Journal. They contended that Conley had followed another employee into the building, intending to rob her, but found Phagan was an easier target. The police placed little credence in the officials' theory, but had no explanation for the failure to locate Phagan's purse that other witnesses had testified she carried that day. They were also concerned that Conley did not mention that he was aware a crime had been committed when he wrote the notes, suggesting Frank had simply dictated the notes to Conley arbitrarily. To resolve their doubts, the police attempted on May 28 to arrange a confrontation between Frank and Conley. Frank exercised his right not to meet without his attorney, who was out of town. The police were quoted in The Atlanta Constitution saying that this refusal was an indication of Frank's guilt, and the meeting never took place.

On May 29, Conley was interviewed for four hours. His new affidavit said that Frank told him, "he had picked up a girl back there and let her fall and that her head hit against something." Conley said he and Frank took the body to the basement via the elevator, then returned to Frank's office where the murder notes were dictated. Conley then hid in the wardrobe after the two had returned to the office. He said Frank gave him $200, but took it back, saying, "Let me have that and I will make it all right with you Monday if I live and nothing happens." Conley's affidavit concluded, "The reason I have not told this before is I thought Mr. Frank would get out and help me out and I decided to tell the whole truth about this matter." At trial, Conley changed his story concerning the $200. He said Frank decided to withhold the money until Conley had burned Phagan's body in the basement furnace.

The Georgian hired William Manning Smith to represent Conley for $40. Smith was known for specializing in representing black clients, and had successfully defended a black man against an accusation of rape by a white woman. He had also taken an elderly black woman's civil case as far as the Georgia Supreme Court. Although Smith believed Conley had told the truth in his final affidavit, he became concerned that Conley was giving long jailhouse interviews with crowds of reporters. Smith was also anxious about reporters from the Hearst papers, who had taken Frank's side. He arranged for Conley to be moved to a different jail, and severed his own relationship with the Georgian.

On February 24, 1914, Conley was sentenced to a year in jail for being an accomplice after the fact to the murder of Mary Phagan.

Media coverage

The Atlanta Constitution broke the story of the murder and was soon in competition with The Atlanta Journal and The Atlanta Georgian. Forty extra editions came out the day Phagan's murder was reported. The Atlanta Georgian published a doctored morgue photo of Phagan, in which her head was shown spliced onto the body of another girl, and ran headlines "Says Women Overheard Conley Confess" and "Says Women Heard Conley Confess" on July 12. The papers offered a total of $1,800 in reward money for information leading to the apprehension of the murderer. Soon after the murder, Atlanta's mayor criticized the police for their steady release of information to the public. The governor, noting the reaction of the public to press sensationalism soon after Lee's and Frank's arrests, organized ten militia companies in case they were needed to repulse mob action against the prisoners. Coverage of the case in the local press continued nearly unabated throughout the investigation, trial, and subsequent appeal process.

Newspaper reports throughout the period combined real evidence, unsubstantiated rumors, and journalistic speculation. Dinnerstein wrote, "Characterized by innuendo, misrepresentation, and distortion, the yellow journalism account of Mary Phagan's death aroused an anxious city, and within a few days, a shocked state." Different segments of the population focused on different aspects. Atlanta's working class saw Frank as "a defiler of young girls", while the German-Jewish community saw him as "an exemplary man and loyal husband." Albert Lindemann, author of The Jew Accused, opined that "ordinary people" may have had difficulty evaluating the often unreliable information and in "suspend[ing] judgment over a long period of time" while the case developed. As the press shaped public opinion, much of the public's attention was directed at the police and the prosecution, whom they expected to bring Phagan's killer to justice. The prosecutor, Hugh Dorsey, had recently lost two high-profile murder cases; one state newspaper wrote that "another defeat, and in a case where the feeling was so intense, would have been, in all likelihood, the end of Mr. Dorsey, as solicitor."

Trial

On May 23, 1913, a grand jury convened to hear evidence for an indictment against Leo Frank for the murder of Mary Phagan. The prosecutor, Hugh Dorsey, presented only enough information to obtain the indictment, assuring the jury that additional information would be provided during the trial. The next day, May 24, the jury voted for an indictment. Meanwhile, Frank's legal team suggested to the media that Jim Conley was the actual killer, and put pressure on another grand jury to indict him. The jury foreman, on his own authority, convened the jury on July 21; on Dorsey's advice, they decided not to indict Conley.

On July 28, the trial began at the Fulton County Superior Court (old city hall building). The judge, Leonard S. Roan, had been serving as a judge in Georgia since 1900. The prosecution team was led by Dorsey and included William Smith (Conley's attorney and Dorsey's jury consultant). Frank was represented by a team of eight lawyersincluding jury selection specialistsled by Luther Rosser, Reuben Arnold, and Herbert Haas. In addition to the hundreds of spectators inside, a large crowd gathered outside to watch the trial through the windows. The defense, in their legal appeals, would later cite the crowds as factors in intimidation of the witnesses and jury.

Both legal teams, in planning their trial strategy, considered the implications of trying a white man based on the testimony of a black man in front of an early 1900s Georgia jury. Jeffrey Melnick, author of Black-Jewish Relations on Trial: Leo Frank and Jim Conley in the New South, writes that the defense tried to picture Conley as "a new kind of African Americananarchic, degraded, and dangerous." Dorsey, however, pictured Conley as "a familiar type" of "old negro", like a minstrel or plantation worker. Dorsey's strategy played on prejudices of the white 1900s Georgia observers, i.e., that a black man could not have been intelligent enough to make up a complicated story. The prosecution argued that Conley's statement explaining the immediate aftermath of the murder was true, that Frank was the murderer, and that Frank had dictated the murder notes to Conley in an effort to pin the crime on Newt Lee, the night watchman.

The prosecution presented witnesses who testified to bloodstains and strands of hair found on the lathe, to support their theory that the murder occurred on the factory's second floor in the machine room near Frank's office. The defense denied that the murder occurred on the second floor. Both sides contested the significance of physical evidence that suggested the place of the murder. Material found around Phagan's neck was shown to be present throughout the factory. The prosecution interpreted the scene in the basement to support Conley's storythat the body was carried there by elevatorwhile the defense suggested that the drag marks on the floor indicated that Conley carried the body down a ladder and then dragged it across the floor. The defense argued that Conley was the murderer and that Newt Lee helped Conley write the two murder notes. The defense brought many witnesses to support Frank's account of his movements, which indicated he did not have enough time to commit the crime.

The defense, to support their theory that Conley murdered Phagan in a robbery, focused on Phagan's missing purse. Conley claimed in court that he saw Frank place the purse in his office safe, although he denied having seen the purse before the trial. Another witness testified that, on the Monday after the murder, the safe was open and there was no purse in it. The significance of Phagan's torn pay envelope was disputed by both sides.

Frank's alleged sexual behavior
The prosecution focused on Frank's alleged sexual behavior. They alleged that Frank, with Conley's assistance, regularly met with women in his office for sexual relations. On the day of the murder, Conley said he saw Phagan go upstairs, from where he heard a scream coming shortly after. He then said he dozed off; when he woke up, Frank called him upstairs and showed him Phagan's body, admitting that he had hurt her. Conley repeated statements from his affidavits that he and Frank took Phagan's body to the basement via the elevator, before returning in the elevator to the office where Frank dictated the murder notes.

Conley was cross-examined by the defense for 16 hours over three days, but the defense failed to break his story. The defense then moved to have Conley's entire testimony concerning the alleged rendezvous stricken from the record. Judge Roan noted that an early objection might have been upheld, but since the jury could not forget what it had heard, he allowed the evidence to stand. The prosecution, to support Frank's alleged expectation of a visit from Phagan, produced Helen Ferguson, a factory worker who first informed Phagan's parents of her death. Ferguson testified that she had tried to get Phagan's pay on Friday from Frank, but was told that Phagan would have to come in person. Both the person behind the pay window and the woman behind Ferguson in the pay line disputed this version of events, testifying that in accordance with his normal practice, Frank did not disburse pay that day.

The defense called a number of factory girls, who testified that they had never seen Frank flirting with or touching the girls, and that they considered him to be of good character. In the prosecution's rebuttal, Dorsey called "a steady parade of former factory workers" to ask them the question, "Do you know Mr. Frank's character for lasciviousness?" The answers were usually "bad".

Timeline

The prosecution realized early on that issues relating to time would be an essential part of its case. At trial, each side presented witnesses to support their version of the timeline for the hours before and after the murder. The starting point was the time of death; the prosecution, relying on the analysis of stomach contents by their expert witness, argued that Phagan died between 12:00 and 12:15 p.m.

A prosecution witness, Monteen Stover, said she had gone into the office to get her paycheck, waiting there from 12:05 to 12:10, and did not see Frank in his office. The prosecution's theory was that Stover did not see Frank because he was at that time murdering Phagan in the metal room. Stover's account did not match Frank's initial account that he had not left the office between noon and 12:30. Other testimony indicated that Phagan exited the trolley (or tram) between 12:07 and 12:10. From the stop it was a two- to four-minute walk, suggesting that Stover arrived first, making her testimony and its implications irrelevant: Frank could not be killing Phagan because at the time she had not yet arrived.

Lemmie Quinn, foreman of the metal room, testified that he spoke briefly with Frank in his office at 12:20. Frank had not mentioned Quinn when the police first interviewed him about his whereabouts at noontime on April 26. Frank had said at the coroner's inquest that Quinn arrived less than ten minutes after Phagan had left his office, and during the murder trial said Quinn arrived hardly five minutes after Phagan left. According to Conley and several experts called by the defense, it would have taken at least thirty minutes to murder Phagan, take the body to the basement, return to the office, and write the murder notes. By the defense's calculations, Frank's time was fully accounted for from 11:30 a.m. to 1:30 p.m., except for eighteen minutes between 12:02 and 12:20. Hattie Hall, a stenographer, said at trial that Frank had specifically requested that she come in that Saturday and that Frank had been working in his office from 11:00 to nearly noon. The prosecution labeled Quinn's testimony as "a fraud" and reminded the jury that early in the police investigation Frank had not mentioned Quinn.

Newt Lee, the night watchman, arrived at work shortly before 4:00 and Frank, who was normally calm, came bustling out of his office. Frank told Lee that he had not yet finished his own work and asked Lee to return at 6:00. Newt Lee noticed that Frank was very agitated and asked if he could sleep in the packing room, but Frank was insistent that Lee leave the building and told Lee to go out and have a good time in town before coming back.

When Lee returned at 6:00, James Gantt had also arrived. Lee told police that Gantt, a former employee who had been fired by Frank after $2 was found missing from the cash box, wanted to look for two pairs of shoes he had left at the factory. Frank allowed Gantt in, although Lee said that Frank appeared to be upset by Gantt's appearance. Frank arrived home at 6:25; at 7:00, he called Lee to determine if everything had gone all right with Gantt.

Conviction and sentencing
During the trial, the prosecution alleged bribery and witness tampering attempts by the Frank legal team. Meanwhile, the defense requested a mistrial because it believed the jurors had been intimidated by the people inside and outside the courtroom, but the motion was denied. Fearing for the safety of Frank and his lawyers in case of an acquittal, Roan and the defense agreed that neither Frank nor his defense attorneys would be present when the verdict was read. On August 25, 1913, after less than four hours of deliberation, the jury reached a unanimous guilty verdict convicting Frank of murder.

The Constitution described the scene as Dorsey emerged from the steps of city hall: "...three muscular men swung Mr. Dorsey, (the prosecuting attorney,) on their shoulders and passed him over the heads of the crowd across the street to his office. With hat raised and tears coursing down his cheeks, the victor in Georgia’s most noted criminal battle was tumbled over a shrieking throng that wildly proclaimed its admiration."

On August 26, the day after the guilty verdict was reached by the jury, Judge Roan brought counsel into private chambers and sentenced Leo Frank to death by hanging with the date set to October 10. The defense team issued a public protest, alleging that public opinion unconsciously influenced the jury to the prejudice of Frank. This argument was carried forward throughout the appeal process.

Appeals

Under Georgia law at the time, appeals of death penalty cases had to be based on errors of law, not a re-evaluation of the evidence presented at trial. The appeals process began with a reconsideration by the original trial judge. The defense presented a written appeal alleging 115 procedural problems. These included claims of jury prejudice, intimidation of the jury by the crowds outside the courthouse, the admission of Conley's testimony concerning Frank's alleged sexual perversions and activities, and the return of a verdict based on an improper weighing of the evidence. Both sides called forth witnesses involving the charges of prejudice and intimidation; while the defense relied on non-involved witness testimony, the prosecution found support from the testimony of the jurors themselves. On October 31, 1913, Judge Roan denied the motion, adding, "I have thought about this case more than any other I have ever tried. With all the thought I have put on this case, I am not thoroughly convinced that Frank is guilty or innocent. But I do not have to be convinced. The jury was convinced. There is no room to doubt that."

State appeals
The next step, a hearing before the Georgia Supreme Court, was held on December 15. In addition to presenting the existing written record, each side was granted two hours for oral arguments. In addition to the old arguments, the defense focused on the reservations expressed by Judge Roan at the reconsideration hearing, citing six cases where new trials had been granted after the trial judge expressed misgivings about the jury verdict. The prosecution countered with arguments that the evidence convicting Frank was substantial and that listing Judge Roan's doubts in the defense's bill of exceptions was not the proper vehicle for "carry[ing] the views of the judge." On February 17, 1914, in a 142-page decision, the court denied Frank a new trial by a 4–2 vote. The majority dismissed the allegations of bias by the jurors, saying the power of determining this rested strictly with the trial judge except when an "abuse of discretion" was proved. It also ruled that spectator influence could only be the basis of a new trial if ruled so by the trial judge. Conley's testimony on Frank's alleged sexual conduct was found to be admissible because, even though it suggested Frank had committed other crimes for which he was not charged, it made Conley's statements more credible and helped to explain Frank's motivation for committing the crime according to the majority. On Judge Roan's stated reservations, the court ruled that these did not trump his legal decision to deny a motion for a new trial. The dissenting justices restricted their opinion to Conley's testimony, which they declared should not have been allowed to stand: "It is perfectly clear to us that evidence of prior bad acts of lasciviousness committed by the defendant ... did not tend to prove a preexisting design, system, plan, or scheme, directed toward making an assault upon the deceased or killing her to prevent its disclosure." They concluded that the evidence prejudiced Frank in the jurors' eyes and denied him a fair trial.

The last hearing exhausted Frank's ordinary state appeal rights. On March 7, 1914, Frank's execution was set for April 17 of that year. The defense continued to investigate the case and filed an extraordinary motion before the Georgia Supreme Court. This appeal, which would be held before a single justice, Ben Hill, was restricted to raising facts not available at the original trial. The application for appeal resulted in a stay of execution and the hearing opened on April 23, 1914. The defense successfully obtained a number of affidavits from witnesses repudiating their testimony. A state biologist said in a newspaper interview that his microscopic examination of the hair on the lathe shortly after the murder did not match Phagan's. At the same time that the various repudiations were leaked to the newspapers, the state was busy seeking repudiations of the new affidavits. An analysis of the murder notes, which had only been addressed in any detail in the closing arguments, suggested Conley composed them in the basement rather than writing what Frank told him to write in his office. Prison letters written by Conley to Annie Maude Carter were discovered; the defense then argued that these, along with Carter's testimony, implicated Conley as the actual murderer.

The defense also raised a federal constitutional issue on whether Frank's absence from the court when the verdict was announced "constituted deprivation of the due process of law". Different attorneys were brought in to argue this point since Rosser and Arnold had acquiesced in Frank's absence. There was a debate between Rosser and Arnold on whether it should be raised at this time since its significance might be lost with all of the other evidence being presented. Louis Marshall, President of the American Jewish Committee and constitutional lawyer, urged them to raise the point, and the decision was made that it should be made clear that if the extraordinary motion was rejected they intended to appeal through the federal court system and there would be an impression of injustice in the trial. For almost every issue presented by the defense, the state had a response: most of the repudiations were either retracted or disavowed by the witnesses; the question of whether outdated order pads used to write the murder notes had been in the basement before the murder was disputed; the integrity of the defense's investigators were questioned and intimidation and bribery were charged; and the significance of Conley's letters to Annie Carter was disputed. The defense, in its rebuttal, tried to bolster the testimony relating to the murder notes and the Carter letters. (These issues were reexamined later when the governor considered commuting Frank's sentence.) During the defense's closing argument, the issue of the repudiations was put to rest by Judge Hill's ruling that the court could only consider the revocation of testimony if the subject were tried and found guilty of perjury. The judge denied Frank a new trial and the full court upheld the decision on November 14, 1914. The full court also said that the due process issue should have been raised earlier, characterizing what it considered a belated effort as "trifling with the court".

Federal appeals
The next step for the Frank team was to appeal the issue through the federal system. The original request for a writ of error on the absence of Frank from the jury's announcement of the verdict was first denied by Justice Joseph Rucker Lamar and then Justice Oliver Wendell Holmes Jr. Both denied the request because they agreed with the Georgia court that the issue was raised too late. The full Supreme Court then heard arguments, but denied the motion without issuing a written decision. However, Holmes said, "I very seriously doubt if the petitioner ... has had due process of law ... because of the trial taking place in the presence of a hostile demonstration and seemingly dangerous crowd, thought by the presiding Judge to be ready for violence unless a verdict of guilty was rendered." Holmes's statement, as well as public indignation over this latest rejection by the courts, encouraged Frank's team to attempt a habeas corpus motion, arguing that the threat of crowd violence had forced Frank to be absent from the verdict hearing and constituted a violation of due process. Justice Lamar heard the motion and agreed that the full Supreme Court should hear the appeal.

On April 19, 1915, the Supreme Court denied the appeal by a 7–2 vote in the case Frank v. Mangum. Part of the decision repeated the message of the last decision: that Frank failed "to raise the objection in due season when fully cognizant of the fact." Holmes and Charles Evans Hughes dissented, with Holmes writing, "It is our duty to declare lynch law as little valid when practiced by a regularly drawn jury as when administered by one elected by a mob intent on death."

Commutation of sentence

Hearing

On April 22, 1915, an application for a commutation of Frank's death sentence was submitted to a three-person Prison Commission in Georgia; it was rejected on June 9 by a vote of 2–1. The dissenter indicated that he felt it was wrong to execute a man "on the testimony of an accomplice, when the circumstances of the crime tend to fix the guilt upon the accomplice." The application then passed to Governor John Slaton. Slaton had been elected in 1912 and his term would end four days after Frank's scheduled execution. In 1913, before Phagan's murder, Slaton agreed to merge his law firm with that of Luther Rosser, who became Frank's lead attorney (Slaton was not directly involved in the original trial). After the commutation, popular Georgia politician Tom Watson attacked Slaton, often focusing on his partnership with Rosser as a conflict of interest.

Slaton opened hearings on June 12. In addition to receiving presentations from both sides with new arguments and evidence, Slaton visited the crime scene and reviewed over 10,000 pages of documents. This included various letters, including one written by Judge Roan shortly before he died asking Slaton to correct his mistake. Slaton also received more than 1,000 death threats. During the hearing, former Governor Joseph Brown warned Slaton, "In all frankness, if Your Excellency wishes to invoke lynch law in Georgia and destroy trial by jury, the way to do it is by retrying this case and reversing all the courts." According to Tom Watson's biographer, C. Vann Woodward, "While the hearings of the petition to commute were in progress Watson sent a friend to the governor with the promise that if Slaton allowed Frank to hang, Watson would be his 'friend', which would result in his 'becoming United States senator and the master of Georgia politics for twenty years to come.'"

Slaton produced a 29-page report. In the first part, he criticized outsiders who were unfamiliar with the evidence, especially the press in the North. He defended the trial court's decision, which he felt was sufficient for a guilty verdict. He summarized points of the state's case against Frank that "any reasonable person" would accept and said of Conley that "It is hard to conceive that any man's power of fabrication of minute details could reach that which Conley showed, unless it be the truth." After having made these points, Slaton's narrative changed course and asked the rhetorical question, "Did Conley speak the truth?" Leonard Dinnerstein wrote, "Slaton based his opinions primarily upon the inconsistencies he had discovered in the narrative of Jim Conley." Two factors stood out to Slaton: the transporting of the body to the basement and the murder notes.

Transport of the body
During the initial investigation, police had noted undisturbed human excrement in the elevator shaft, which Conley said he had left there before the murder. Use of the elevator on the Monday after the murder crushed the excrement, which Slaton concluded was an indication that the elevator could not have been used as described by Conley, casting doubt on his testimony.
 
During the commutation hearing, Slaton asked Dorsey to address this issue. Dorsey said that the elevator did not always go all the way to the bottom and could be stopped anywhere. Frank's attorney rebutted this by quoting Conley, who said that the elevator stops when it hits the bottom. Slaton interviewed others and conducted his own tests on his visit to the factory, concluding that every time the elevator made the trip to the basement it touched the bottom. Slaton said, "If the elevator was not used by Conley and Frank in taking the body to the basement, then the explanation of Conley cannot be accepted."

Murder notes
The murder notes had been analyzed before at the extraordinary motion hearing. Handwriting expert Albert S. Osborn reviewed the previous evidence at the commutation hearing and commented, for the first time, that the notes were written in the third person rather than the first person. He said that the first person would have been more logical since they were intended to be the final statements of a dying Phagan. He argued this was the type of error that Conley would have made, rather than Frank, as Conley was a sweeper and not a Cornell-educated manager like Frank.

Conley's former attorney, William Smith, had become convinced that his client had committed the murder. Smith produced a 100-page analysis of the notes for the defense. He analyzed "speech and writing patterns" and "spelling, grammar, repetition of adjectives, [and] favorite verb forms". He concluded, "In this article I show clearly that Conley did not tell the truth about those notes." Slaton compared the murder notes, Conley's letters to Annie Maude Carter, and his trial testimony. Throughout these documents, he found similar use of the words "like", "play", "lay", "love", and "hisself". He also found double adjectives such as "long tall negro", "tall, slim build heavy man", and "good long wide piece of cord in his hands".

Slaton was also convinced that the murder notes were written in the basement, not in Frank's office. Slaton accepted the defense's argument that the notes were written on dated order pads signed by a former employee that were only kept in the basement. Slaton wrote that the employee signed an affidavit stating that, when he left the company in 1912, "he personally packed up all of the duplicate orders ... and sent them down to the basement to be burned. This evidence was never passed upon by the jury and developed since the trial."

Timing and physical evidence
Slaton's narrative touched on other aspects of the evidence and testimony that suggested reasonable doubt. For example, he accepted the defense's argument that charges by Conley of perversion were based on someone coaching him that Jews were circumcised. He accepted the defense's interpretation of the timeline; citing the evidence produced at trialincluding the possibility that Stover did not see Frank because she did not proceed further than the outer officehe wrote: "Therefore, Monteen Stover must have arrived before Mary Phagan, and while Monteen Stover was in the room it hardly seems possible under the evidence, that Mary Phagan was at that time being murdered." Slaton also said that Phagan's head wound must have bled profusely, yet there was no blood found on the lathe, the ground nearby, in the elevator, or the steps leading downstairs. He also said that Phagan's nostrils and mouth were filled with dirt and sawdust which could only have come from the basement.

Slaton also commented on Conley's story (that Conley was watching out for the arrival of a lady for Frank on the day of the murder):

Conclusion
On Monday, June 21, 1915, Slaton released the order to commute Frank's murder conviction to life imprisonment. Slaton's legal rationale was that there was sufficient new evidence not available at the original trial to justify Frank's actions. He wrote:

 
The commutation was headline news. Atlanta Mayor Jimmy Woodward remarked that "The larger part of the population believes Frank guilty and that the commutation was a mistake." In response, Slaton invited the press to his home that afternoon, telling them:

He also told reporters that he was certain that Conley was the actual murderer. Slaton privately told friends that he would have issued a full pardon, if not for his belief that Frank would soon be able to prove his own innocence.

Reaction of the public
The public was outraged. A mob threatened to attack the governor at his home. A detachment of the Georgia National Guard, along with county policemen and a group of Slaton's friends who were sworn in as deputies, dispersed the mob. Slaton had been a popular governor, but he and his wife left Georgia immediately thereafter.

For Frank's protection, he was taken to the Milledgeville State Penitentiary in the middle of the night before the commutation was announced. However, on July 17, The New York Times reported that fellow inmate William Creen tried to kill Frank by slashing his throat with a  butcher knife, severing his jugular vein. The attacker told the authorities he "wanted to keep the other inmates safe from mob violence, Frank's presence was a disgrace to the prison, and he was sure he would be pardoned if he killed Frank."

Antisemitism and media coverage

The sensationalism in the press started before the trial and continued throughout the trial, the appeals process, the commutation decision, and beyond. At the time, local papers were the dominant source of information, but they were not entirely anti-Frank. The Constitution alone assumed Frank's guilt, while both the Georgian and the Journal would later comment about the public hysteria in Atlanta during the trial, each suggesting the need to reexamine the evidence against the defendant. On March 14, 1914, while the extraordinary motion hearing was pending, the Journal called for a new trial, saying that to execute Frank based on the atmosphere both within and outside the courtroom would "amount to judicial murder." Other newspapers in the state followed suit and many ministers spoke from the pulpit supporting a new trial. L. O. Bricker, the pastor of the church attended by Phagan's family, said that based on "the awful tension of public feeling, it was next to impossible for a jury of our fellow human beings to have granted him a fair, fearless and impartial trial."

On October 12, 1913, the New York Sun became the first major Northern paper to give a detailed account of the Frank trial. In discussing the charges of antisemitism in the trial, it described Atlanta as more liberal on the subject than any other Southern cities. It went on to say that antisemitism did arise during the trial as Atlantans reacted to statements attributed to Frank's Jewish supporters, who dismissed Phagan as "nothing but a factory girl". The paper said, "The anti-Semitic feeling was the natural result of the belief that the Jews had banded to free Frank, innocent or guilty. The supposed solidarity of the Jews for Frank, even if he was guilty, caused a Gentile solidarity against him." On November 8, 1913, the executive committee of the American Jewish Committee, headed by Louis Marshall, addressed the Frank case. They did so following Judge Roan's reconsideration motion and motivated by the issues raised in the Sun. They chose not to take a public stance as a committee, instead deciding to raise funds individually to influence public opinion in favor of Frank.

Albert Lasker, a wealthy advertising magnate, responded to these calls to help Frank. Lasker contributed personal funds and arranged a public relations effort in support of Frank. In Atlanta, during the time of the extraordinary motion, Lasker coordinated Frank's meetings with the press and coined the slogan "The Truth Is on the March" to characterize the efforts of Frank's defense team. He persuaded prominent figures such as Thomas Edison, Henry Ford, and Jane Addams to make statements supporting Frank. During the commutation hearing, Vice President Thomas R. Marshall weighed in, as did many leading magazine and newspaper editors, including Herbert Croly, editor of the New Republic; C.P.J. Mooney, editor of the Chicago Tribune; Mark Sullivan, editor of Collier's; R. E. Stafford, editor of the Daily Oklahoman; and D. D. Moore, editor of the New Orleans Times-Picayune. Adolph Ochs, publisher of The New York Times, became involved about the same time as Lasker, organizing a prolonged campaign advocating for a new trial for Frank. Lindemann argues that the publicity campaign had a wide national reach:Outside of Georgia, as the case gained national visibility, widespread sympathy for Frank was expressed. He received at final count close to a hundred thousand letters of sympathy in jail, and prominent figures throughout the country, including governors of other states, U.S. senators, clergymen, university presidents, and labor leaders, spoke up in his defense. Thousands of petitions in his favor, containing over a million signatures, flowed in. 

Both Ochs and Lasker attempted to heed Louis Marshall's warnings about antagonizing the "sensitiveness of the southern people and engender the feeling that the north is criticizing the courts and the people of Georgia." Dinnerstein writes that these attempts failed, "because many Georgians interpreted every item favorable to Frank as a hostile act."

Tom Watson, editor of the Jeffersonian, had remained publicly silent during Frank's trial. Among Watson's political enemies was Senator Hoke Smith, former owner of The Atlanta Journal, which was still considered to be Smith's political instrument. When the Journal called for a reevaluation of the evidence against Frank, Watson, in the March 19, 1914 edition of his magazine, attacked Smith for trying "to bring the courts into disrepute, drag down the judges to the level of criminals, and destroy the confidence of the people in the orderly process of the law." Watson also questioned whether Frank expected "extraordinary favors and immunities because of his race" and questioned the wisdom of Jews to "risk the good name ... of the whole race" to save "the decadent offshoot of a great people." Subsequent articles concentrated on the Frank case and became more and more impassioned in their attacks. C. Vann Woodward writes that Watson "pulled all the stops: Southern chivalry, sectional animus, race prejudice, class consciousness, agrarian resentment, state pride."

When describing the public reaction to Frank, historians mention the class and ethnic tensions in play while acknowledging the complexity of the case and the difficulty in gauging the importance of his Jewishness, class, and northern background. Historian John Higham writes that "economic resentment, frustrated progressivism, and race consciousness combined to produce a classic case of lynch law. ... Hatred of organized wealth reaching into Georgia from outside became a hatred of Jewish wealth." Historian Nancy MacLean writes that some historians have argued that this was an American Dreyfus affair, which she said "[could] be explained only in light of the social tensions unleashed by the growth of industry and cities in the turn-of-the-century South. These circumstances made a Jewish employer a more fitting scapegoat for disgruntled whites than the other leading suspect in the case, a black worker." Albert Lindemann said that Frank on trial found himself "in a position of much latent tension and symbolism." Stating that it is impossible to determine the extent to which antisemitism affected his image, he concluded that "[Frank was seen as] a representative of Yankee capitalism in a southern city, with row upon row of southern women, often the daughters and wives of ruined farmers, 'at his mercy'a rich, punctilious, northern Jew lording it over vulnerable and impoverished working women."

Abduction and lynching of Frank

The June 21, 1915 commutation provoked Tom Watson into advocating Frank's lynching. He wrote in The Jeffersonian and Watson's Magazine: "This country has nothing to fear from its rural communities. Lynch law is a good sign; it shows that a sense of justice lives among the people." A group of prominent men organized themselves into the "Vigilance Committee" and openly planned to kidnap Frank from prison. They consisted of 28 men with various skills: an electrician was to cut the prison wires, car mechanics were to keep the cars running, and there was a locksmith, a telephone man, a medic, a hangman, and a lay preacher. The ringleaders were well known locally but were not named publicly until June 2000, when a local librarian posted a list on the Web based on information compiled by Mary Phagan's great-niece, Mary Phagan Kean (b. 1953). The list included Joseph Mackey Brown, former governor of Georgia; Eugene Herbert Clay, former mayor of Marietta and later president of the Georgia Senate; E. P. Dobbs, mayor of Marietta at the time; Moultrie McKinney Sessions, lawyer and banker; part of the Marietta delegation at Governor Slaton's clemency hearing; several current and former Cobb County sheriffs; and other individuals of various professions.

On the afternoon of August 16, the eight cars of the lynch mob left Marietta separately for Milledgeville. They arrived at the prison at around 10:00 p.m., and the electrician cut the telephone wires, members of the group drained the gas from the prison's automobiles, handcuffed the warden, seized Frank, and drove away. The  trip took about seven hours at a top speed of  through small towns on back roads. Lookouts in the towns telephoned ahead to the next town as soon as they saw the line of cars pass by. A site at Frey's Gin, two miles (3 km) east of Marietta, had been prepared, complete with a rope and table supplied by former Sheriff William Frey. The New York Times reported Frank was handcuffed, his legs tied at the ankles, and that he was hanged from a branch of a tree at around 7:00 a.m., facing the direction of the house where Phagan had lived.

The Atlanta Journal wrote that a crowd of men, women, and children arrived on foot, in cars, and on horses, and that souvenir hunters cut away parts of his shirt sleeves. According to The New York Times, one of the onlookers, Robert E. Lee Howellrelated to Clark Howell, editor of The Atlanta Constitutionwanted to have the body cut into pieces and burned, and began to run around, screaming, whipping up the mob. Judge Newt Morris tried to restore order, and asked for a vote on whether the body should be returned to the parents intact; only Howell disagreed. When the body was cut down, Howell started stamping on Frank's face and chest; Morris quickly placed the body in a basket, and he and his driver John Stephens Wood drove it out of Marietta.

In Atlanta, thousands besieged the undertaker's parlor, demanding to see the body; after they began throwing bricks, they were allowed to file past the corpse. Frank's body was then transported by rail on Southern Railway's train No. 36 from Atlanta to New York and buried in the Mount Carmel Cemetery in Glendale, Queens, New York on August 20, 1915. (When Lucille Frank died, she was not buried with Leo; she was cremated, and eventually buried next to her parents' graves.) The New York Times wrote that the vast majority of Cobb County believed he had received his "just deserts", and that the lynch mob had simply stepped in to uphold the law after Governor Slaton arbitrarily set it aside. A Cobb County grand jury was convened to indict the lynchers; although they were well known locally, none were identified, and some of the lynchers may have served on the very same grand jury that was investigating them. Nat Harris, the newly elected governor who succeeded Slaton, promised to punish the mob, issuing a $1,500 state reward for information. Despite this, Charles Willis Thompson of The New York Times said that the citizens of Marietta "would die rather than reveal their knowledge or even their suspicion [of the identities of the lynchers]", and the local Macon Telegraph said, "Doubtless they can be apprehendeddoubtful they will."

Several photographs were taken of the lynching, which were published and sold as postcards in local stores for 25 cents each; also sold were pieces of the rope, Frank's nightshirt, and branches from the tree. According to Elaine Marie Alphin, author of An Unspeakable Crime: The Prosecution and Persecution of Leo Frank, they were selling so fast that the police announced that sellers would require a city license. In the postcards, members of the lynch mob or crowd can be seen posing in front of the body, one of them holding a portable camera. Historian Amy Louise Wood writes that local newspapers did not publish the photographs because it would have been too controversial, given that the lynch mob can be clearly seen and that the lynching was being condemned around the country. The Columbia State, which opposed the lynching, wrote: "The heroic Marietta lynchers are too modest to give their photographs to the newspapers." Wood also writes that a news film of the lynching that included the photographs was released, although it focused on the crowds without showing Frank's body; its showing was prevented by censorship boards around the U.S., though Wood says there is no evidence that it was stopped in Atlanta.

After the trial
The lynching of Frank and its publicity temporarily halted lynchings.

Leo Frank's case was mentioned by Adolf Kraus when he announced the creation of the Anti-Defamation League in October 1913. After Frank's lynching, around half of Georgia's 3,000 Jews left the state. According to author Steve Oney, "What it did to Southern Jews can't be discounted ... It drove them into a state of denial about their Judaism. They became even more assimilated, anti-Israel, Episcopalian. The Temple did away with chupahs at weddingsanything that would draw attention." Many American Jews saw Frank as an American Alfred Dreyfus, like Frank, a victim of antisemitic persecution.

Two weeks after the lynching, in the September 2, 1915 issue of The Jeffersonian, Watson wrote, "the voice of the people is the voice of God", capitalizing on his sensational coverage of the controversial trial. In 1914, when Watson began reporting his anti-Frank message, The Jeffersonian's circulation had been 25,000; by September 2, 1915, its circulation was 87,000.

The consensus of researchers on the subject is that Frank was wrongly convicted. The Atlanta Constitution stated it was investigating the case again in the 1940s. A reporter who visited Frank's widow (she never remarried), Lucille, stated that she started crying when he discussed the case with her.

Jeffrey Melnick wrote, "There is near unanimity around the idea that Frank was most certainly innocent of the crime of murdering Mary Phagan." Other historians and journalists have written that the trial was "a miscarriage of justice" and "a gross injustice", "a mockery of justice", that "there can be no doubt, of course, that ... [Frank was] innocent", that "Leo Frank ... was unjustly and wrongly convicted of murder", that he "was falsely convicted", and that "the evidence against Frank was shaky, to say the least". C. Vann Woodward, like many other authors, believed that Conley was the actual murderer and was "implicated by evidence overwhelmingly more incriminating than any produced against Frank."

Critics cite a number of problems with the conviction. Local newspaper coverage, even before Frank was officially charged, was deemed to be inaccurate and prejudicial. Some claimed that the prosecutor Hugh Dorsey was under pressure for a quick conviction because of recent unsolved murders and made a premature decision that Frank was guilty, a decision that his personal ambition would not allow him to reconsider. Later analysis of evidence, primarily by Governor Slaton and Conley's attorney William Smith, seemed to exculpate Frank while implicating Conley.

Websites supporting the view that Frank was guilty of murdering Phagan emerged around the centennial of the Phagan murder in 2013. The Anti-Defamation League issued a press release condemning what it called "misleading websites" from "anti-Semites ... to promote anti-Jewish views".

Applications for posthumous pardon

First attempt
In 1982, Alonzo Mann, who had been Frank's office boy at the time of Phagan's murder, told The Tennessean that he had seen Jim Conley alone shortly after noon carrying Phagan's body through the lobby toward the ladder descending into the basement. Though Mann's testimony was not sufficient to settle the issue, it was the basis of an attempt by Charles Wittenstein, Southern counsel for the Anti-Defamation League, and Dale Schwartz, an Atlanta lawyer, to obtain a posthumous pardon for Frank from the Georgia State Board of Pardons and Paroles. The board also reviewed the files from Slaton's commutation decision. It denied the pardon in 1983, hindered in its investigation by the lack of available records. It concluded that, "After exhaustive review and many hours of deliberation, it is impossible to decide conclusively the guilt or innocence of Leo M. Frank. For the board to grant a pardon, the innocence of the subject must be shown conclusively." At the time, the lead editorial in The Atlanta Constitution began, "Leo Frank has been lynched a second time."

Second attempt
Frank supporters submitted a second application for pardon, asking the state only to recognize its culpability over his death. The board granted the pardon in 1986. It said:

In response to the pardon, an editorial by Fred Grimm in the Miami Herald said, "A salve for one of the South's most hateful, festering memories, was finally applied."

Historical marker
In 2008, a state historical marker was erected by the Georgia Historical Society, the Jewish American Society for Historic Preservation, and Temple Kol Emeth, near the building at 1200 Roswell Road, Marietta where Frank was lynched. In 2015, the Georgia Historical Society, the Atlanta History Center, and the Jewish American Society for Historic Preservation dedicated a Georgia Historical Society marker honoring Governor John M. Slaton at the Atlanta History Center.

Anti-lynching memorial

In 2018, The Jewish American Society for Historic Preservation, with support from the ADL, and Rabbi Steve Lebow of Temple Kol Emeth, placed the first national anti-lynching memorial at the Georgia Department of Transportation designated Leo Frank memorial site. The anti-lynching memorial was facilitated by a strong letter of support to the Georgia Department of Transportation by the late Congressman John Lewis when the Department turned down siting permission. The text of the anti-lynching memorial text reads, "In Respectful Memory of the Thousands Across America, Denied Justice by Lynching; Victims of Hatred, Prejudice and Ignorance. Between 1880-1946, ~570 Georgians Were Lynched."

Conviction Integrity Unit
In 2019, Fulton County District Attorney Paul Howard founded an eight-member panel called the Conviction Integrity Unit to investigate the cases of Wayne Williams and Frank. The board will re-examine the cases and make recommendations to Howard on whether they should be re-adjudicated.

In popular culture

During the trial, the Atlanta musician and millworker Fiddlin' John Carson wrote and performed a murder ballad entitled "Little Mary Phagan". During the mill strikes of 1914, Carson sang "Little Mary Phagan" to crowds from the Fulton County courthouse steps. His daughter, Moonshine Kate, later recorded the song. An unrecorded Carson song, "Dear Old Oak in Georgia", sentimentalizes the tree from which Leo Frank was hanged.

The Frank case has been the subject of several media adaptations. In 1921, African-American director Oscar Micheaux directed a silent race film entitled The Gunsaulus Mystery, followed by Murder in Harlem in 1935. In 1937, Mervyn LeRoy directed They Won't Forget, based on the Ward Greene novel Death in The Deep South, which was in turn inspired by the Frank case. An episode of the 1964 TV series Profiles in Courage dramatized Governor John M. Slaton's decision to commute Frank's sentence. The episode starred Walter Matthau as Governor Slaton and Michael Constantine as Tom Watson. The 1988 TV miniseries The Murder of Mary Phagan was broadcast on NBC, starring Jack Lemmon as Gov. John Slaton and also featuring Kevin Spacey. The 1998 Broadway musical Parade, based on the case, won two Tony Awards. In 2009, Ben Loeterman directed the documentary film The People v. Leo Frank.

See also 

 Blood libel
 Beilis affair
 Antisemitism in the United States
 Lynching of Samuel Bierfield
 Abraham Surasky

References
Informational notes

Citations

Bibliography

Alphin, Elaine Marie. An Unspeakable Crime: The Prosecution and Persecution of Leo Frank. Carolrhoda Books, 2010. Google Books abridged version. Retrieved June 10, 2011. .
Carter, Dan. "And the Dead Shall Rise: The Murder of Mary Phagan and the Lynching of Leo Frank". Journal of Southern History, Vol. 71, Issue 2 (May 2005), p. 491. DOI: 10.2307/27648797.
Chanes, Jerome. "Who Does What?". In Maisel, Louis; Forman, Ira; Altschiller, Donald; Bassett, Charles. Jews in American Politics: Essays. Rowman & Littlefield, 2001. p. 105. .
Coleman, Kenneth. A History of Georgia. University of Georgia Press, 1991. .
Dinnerstein, Leonard. Antisemitism in America. Oxford University Press, 1994. Google Books abridged version. Retrieved June 5, 2016. .
Dinnerstein, Leonard. The Leo Frank Case. University of Georgia Press, 1987. .
Eakin, Frank. What Price Prejudice?: Christian Antisemitism in America. Paulist Press, 1998. .
Freedman, Eric. Habeas Corpus: Rethinking the Great Writ of Liberty. New York University Press, 2003. Retrieved August 23, 2014. .
Frey, Robert Seitz; Thompson-Frey, Nancy. The Silent and the Damned: The Murder of Mary Phagan and the Lynching of Leo Frank. New York, New York: Cooper Square Press (of Rowman & Littlefield), 2002. Google Books abridged version. Retrieved June 17, 2015. .
Friedman, Lawrence M. "Front Page: Notes on the Nature and Significance of Headline Trials". St. Louis University Law Journal, Vol. 55, Issue 4 (Summer 2011), pp. 1243–1284.
Golden, Harry. A Little Girl is Dead. World Publishing Company, 1965. Retrieved June 25, 2011. (published in Great Britain as The Lynching of Leo Frank)
Henig, Gerald. "'He Did Not Have a Fair Trial': California Progressives React to the Leo Frank Case". California History, Vol. 58, No. 2 (Summer 1979), pp. 166–178. DOI: 10.2307/25157909.
Higham, John. Strangers in the Land: Patterns of American Nativism, 1860–1925. Rutgers University Press, 1988. .
Knight, Alfred H. The Life of the Law. Oxford University Press, 1996. Google Books abridged version. .
 Kranson, Rachel. "Rethinking the Historiography of American Antisemitism in the Wake of the Pittsburgh Shooting." American Jewish History 105.1 (2021): 247-253. summary
Lawson, John Davison (ed.). American State Trials Volume X (1918), contains the abridged trial testimony and closing arguments starting on p. 182. Retrieved August 23, 2010.
Lindemann, Albert S. The Jew Accused: Three Anti-Semitic Affairs (Dreyfus, Beilis, Frank), 1894–1915. Cambridge University Press, 1991. Google Books abridged version. Retrieved June 11, 2011. .
MacLean, Nancy. "The Leo Frank Case Reconsidered: Gender and Sexual Politics in the Making of Reactionary Populism". The Journal of American History, Vol. 78, No. 3 (December 1991), pp. 917–948. DOI: 10.2307/2078796.
Melnick, Jeffrey Paul. Black-Jewish Relations on Trial: Leo Frank and Jim Conley in the New South. University Press of Mississippi, 2000. Google Books abridged version. .
Moore, Deborah. B'nai B'rith and the Challenge of Ethnic Leadership. State University of New York Press, 1981. .
Moseley, Clement Charlton. "The Case of Leo M. Frank, 1913–1915". The Georgia Historical Quarterly, Vol. 51, No. 1 (March 1967), pp. 42–62. 
Oney, Steve. And the Dead Shall Rise: The Murder of Mary Phagan and the Lynching of Leo Frank. Pantheon Books, 2003. .
Phagan Kean, Mary. The Murder of Little Mary Phagan. Horizon Press, 1987. .
Samuels, Charles; Samuels, Louise Night Fell on Georgia, Dell, 1956 
Theoharis, Athan; Cox, John Stuart. The Boss: J. Edgar Hoover and the Great American Inquisition. Temple University Press, 1988. .
Watson, D. R. "Reviewed Works: Dreyfus: A Family Affair, 1789–1945 by Michael Burns; The Jew Accused: Three Anti-Semitic Affairs (Dreyfus, Beilis, Frank), 1894–1915 by Albert S. Lindemann". The Journal of Modern History, Vol. 66, No. 2 (June 1994), pp. 393–395. DOI: 10.1086/244854.
Wood, Amy Louise. Lynching and Spectacle. The University of North Carolina Press, 2009. .
Woodward, Comer Vann. Tom Watson: Agrarian Rebel. New York: Oxford University Press, 1963. Google Books abridged version.

External links

 Historical marker at the Old Marietta City Cemetery, Marietta, Georgia
 Leo Frank Clemency File  from the Georgia Archives
 Leo Frank Exhibit from the Digital Library of Georgia
 Leo Frank Papers from the Digital Library of Georgia
 Leo M. Frank v. C. Wheeler Mangum, Sheriff of Fulton County, Georgia Writ of habeas corpus filed by Frank

1884 births
1915 deaths
1915 murders in the United States
Burials at Mount Hebron Cemetery (New York City)
Jewish-American lynching victims
Murdered American Jews
20th-century controversies in the United States
Cornell University College of Engineering alumni
Lynching deaths in Georgia (U.S. state)
People convicted of murder by Georgia (U.S. state)
People from Atlanta
People from Brooklyn
People from Cuero, Texas
People from Marietta, Georgia
People murdered in Georgia (U.S. state)
People who have received posthumous pardons
Prisoners sentenced to life imprisonment by Georgia (U.S. state)
Recipients of American gubernatorial clemency
Antisemitic attacks and incidents in the United States
Jews and Judaism in Georgia (U.S. state)
1915 in Judaism
Victims of antisemitic violence
Prisoners sentenced to death by Georgia (U.S. state)
American prisoners sentenced to death
Wrongful convictions